Nhiavu Lobliayao (1915-1990) was a Laotian politician and member of the Lao People's Revolutionary Party (LPRP). He was born in 1915 into an influential Hmong family and died in 1990. He was active in the communist movement since its inception, and was one of the founding members of the LPRP.

He was elected an alternate member of the LPRP Central Committee at the 2nd National Congress. At the 3rd National Congress he was elected a full member of the LPRP Central Committee and served in office until his retirement in 1990.

His older brother was Faydang Lobliayao.

References

Specific

Bibliography
Books:
 

1915 births
1990 deaths
Alternate members of the 2nd Central Committee of the Lao People's Revolutionary Party
Members of the 3rd Central Committee of the Lao People's Revolutionary Party
Lao People's Revolutionary Party politicians
Hmong politicians
Place of birth missing